The inaugural edition of the Canadian Polaris Music Prize presented on September 18, 2006, at Toronto's Phoenix Concert Theatre. The winning album was Final Fantasy's He Poos Clouds.

Nominees
The prize's list of 10 finalist albums, chosen from an initial list of 165 nominees, was announced on July 4.
 Final Fantasy, He Poos Clouds
Broken Social Scene, Broken Social Scene
Cadence Weapon, Breaking Kayfabe
The Deadly Snakes, Porcella
Sarah Harmer, I'm a Mountain
K'naan, The Dusty Foot Philosopher
Malajube, Trompe-l'oeil
Metric, Live It Out
The New Pornographers, Twin Cinema
Wolf Parade, Apologies to the Queen Mary

Album

A compilation album featuring tracks from the ten nominated albums was also released.

Track listing
 Broken Social Scene, "Fire Eye'd Boy"
 Cadence Weapon, "Black Hand"
 The Deadly Snakes, "Gore Veil"
 Final Fantasy, "This Lamb Sells Condos"
 Sarah Harmer, "Goin' Out"
 K'naan, "Soobax"
 Malajube, "Pâte filo"
 Metric, "The Police and the Private"
 The New Pornographers, "Sing Me Spanish Techno"
 Wolf Parade, "Shine a Light"

References

2006 in Canadian music
2006 music awards
Polaris Music Prize